Cristóbal Téllez de Almanza was an auditor licentiate taking over military affairs before becoming the 12th governor of the Philippines under Spanish colonial rule. He is the first Governor-General of the Philippines from the Real Audiencia of Manila. The series of Japanese insurrections began just last year, 1606, when a son of a Japanese was killed by a Spaniard. The Japanese then plotted a revolt. The second Japanese insurrection occurred in 1607.

References

Captains General of the Philippines